Sidney Crain Roach (July 25, 1876 – June 29, 1934) was a U.S. Representative from Missouri.

Born at Linn Creek, Missouri, Roach attended the public schools and the St. Louis Law School (now the Washington University School of Law at Washington University in St. Louis.
He was admitted to the bar in 1897 and commenced practice at Linn Creek, Missouri.
He served as prosecuting attorney for Camden County in 1898–1909.
He served as member of the board of directors of the National Bank of Linn Creek in 1900–1924.
He served as member of the State house of representatives in 1909–1913.
He served as delegate to the Republican National Convention in 1912.

Roach was elected as a Republican to the Sixty-seventh and Sixty-eighth Congresses (March 4, 1921 – March 3, 1925).
He served as chairman of the Committee on Expenditures in the Department of Justice (Sixty-eighth Congress).
He was an unsuccessful candidate for reelection in 1924 to the Sixty-ninth Congress.
He moved to St. Louis, Missouri, December 27, 1924, and resumed the practice of law.
He died in Kansas City, Missouri on June 29, 1934.
He was interred in Roach Cemetery near Roach, Missouri.

References

1876 births
1934 deaths
Republican Party members of the Missouri House of Representatives
Republican Party members of the United States House of Representatives from Missouri
People from Camden County, Missouri
Washington University School of Law alumni